Nosratollah Khosravi-Roodsari is an Iranian-American who was freed during a prisoner exchange between the United States of America and Iran. In August 2013, Khosravi-Roodsari went to Iran to visit family. In May 2015, when attempting to get into a flight to the United States, Koshravi was informed he couldn't leave the country and was taken into custody by the Iranian authorities. According to his lawyer, he was charged with espionage and sending secret information to a hostile government. He spent his imprisonment in Ward 409, Evin Prison, Tehran, which is controlled by Iran's Ministry of Intelligence.

See also 
List of foreign nationals detained in Iran
Human rights in the Islamic Republic of Iran

References 

Living people
American people imprisoned in Iran
Year of birth missing (living people)